On April 10–12, 1965, a devastating severe weather event affected the Midwestern and Southeastern United States. The tornado outbreak produced 55 confirmed tornadoes in one day and 16 hours. The worst part of the outbreak occurred during the afternoon hours of April 11 into the overnight hours going into April 12. The second-largest tornado outbreak on record at the time, this deadly series of tornadoes, which became known as the 1965 Palm Sunday tornado outbreak, inflicted a swath of destruction from Cedar County, Iowa, to Cuyahoga County, Ohio, and a swath  from Kent County, Michigan, to Montgomery County, Indiana. The main part of the outbreak lasted 16 hours and 35 minutes and is among the most intense outbreaks, in terms of tornado strength, ever recorded, including at least four "double/twin funnel" tornadoes. In all, the outbreak killed 266 people, injured 3,662 others, and caused $1.217 billion (1965 USD) in damage.

Background
A vigorous extratropical cyclone centered over the northeastern High Plains, in the region of the Dakotas, was the primary catalyst for widespread severe weather on April 11, 1965. As early as the preceding day, a strong jet stream in the upper two-thirds of the troposphere traversed the southern Great Plains and was responsible for an outbreak of tornadoes from the Kansas–Missouri border to Central Arkansas, including a violent tornado that struck the town of Conway in Faulkner County, Arkansas, killing six people and injuring 200. The following morning, at 7:00 a.m. Retreating northward, a warm front interacted with a shortwave to produce isolated thunderstorms from northern Missouri and Central Illinois to the Lower Peninsula of Michigan.

CDT (18:00 UTC). As the warm front bisected central Iowa and stretched into Illinois and Indiana, a cold front and very dry air aloft—indicative of a potent elevated mixed layer—departed from eastern Kansas. Strong winds transported steep lapse rates within the elevated mixed layer eastward across the Great Plains. Concomitant destabilization of the atmosphere occurred over the warm sector due to abundant sunshine from the elevated mixed layer. Simultaneously, a strong low-level jet stream brought a moistening air mass northward: dew points of at least  reached southernmost Illinois and Indiana by 10:00 a.m. CDT (15:00 UTC). Meanwhile, a pronounced dry line-like boundary near the cold front moved into eastern sections of Arkansas and Missouri. Weather stations from Topeka, Kansas, to Peoria, Illinois, showed very strong vertical shear that favored intense low-level convergence—combined with a moist dew point in the warm sector, an environment favorable for supercell thunderstorms.

A weather balloon launched from Dodge City, Kansas, recorded winds of  aloft; another at Peoria, Illinois, subsequently measured . Minimum dew points of  reached as far north as southern Michigan by mid afternoon. Volatile atmospheric conditions led to thunderstorm activity over eastern Iowa by 1:40–48 p.m. CDT (18:40–48 UTC), the first supercell of which produced the initial tornado of the day. By 6:00 p.m. CDT (23:00 UTC), instability reached record proportions for the time of year over a wide area, with convective available potential energy (CAPE) of at least 1,000 j/kg in the mixed layer over much of Indiana and southernmost Michigan. Record-breaking ambient vertical wind shear in the lowest  of the atmosphere facilitated the explosive development of long-lived mesocyclones and thus long-tracked tornado families.

At 11:45 a.m. CDT (16:45 UTC) on April 11, the Severe Local Storms Unit (SELS) in Kansas City, Missouri, issued an outlook that mentioned the possibility of tornadoes from northeastern Missouri to the northernmost two-thirds of Indiana. At 2:00 p.m. CDT (19:00 UTC)—fifteen minutes after the first tornado was spotted—the first tornado watch of the day was issued, covering portions of northern Illinois and southern Wisconsin. A total of four watches were issued on April 11–12.  For the first time in the U.S. Weather Bureau's history, an entire Weather Bureau Office's jurisdiction, in Northern Indiana, was under a tornado warning; this was termed a "blanket tornado warning" and was later used by several National Weather Service (NWS) offices on April 3, 1974.

Confirmed tornadoes

Lakewood–Crystal Lake–Burtons Bridge–Island Lake, Illinois

This devastating tornado was first detected at 4:27 p.m. CDT (21:27 UTC), but officially touched down seven minutes earlier, in Lakewood. At that time the tornado first produced visible damage, at the Crystal Lake Country Club; two firs on the golf course were prostrated. Crossing Nash Street and McHenry Avenue in Crystal Lake, the tornado unroofed or severely damaged several houses. Alongside U.S. Route 14 the tornado claimed its first fatality, a man in a barn. Nearby gas stations and a strip mall were damaged. At the latter place, a roof sheltering a Piggly Wiggly and a Neisner's collapsed, trapping 20 or more people below. The tornado tossed cars about in the parking lot as well. Shortly afterward, the tornado struck the Colby subdivision, destroying or severely damaging 155 homes. F4-level damage occurred as several homes were completely swept off their foundations. Four deaths occurred in the neighborhood, including three in one family whose home was obliterated. Their bodies were located two blocks distant and a pickup truck was found to have landed in the basement.

After ravaging the Colby neighborhood, the tornado destroyed a number of warehouses and shattered windows. A diesel plant, a wallpaper factory, and a manufacturer sustained damage ranging from light to heavy. The tornado then extensively damaged the Orchard Acres subdivision, crossed Illinois Route 31, and apparently weakened before impacting farmland. A few barns and isolated trees were damaged. The tornado may have dissipated and reformed as a new tornado near the Fox River. The tornado also struck the community of Burtons Bridge. There the tornado badly damaged a number of homes and downed willow trees. Finally, the tornado intersected Illinois Route 176 and produced its final swath of significant damage in Island Lake. In Island Lake the tornado tossed boats ashore, wrecked piers, and caused homes to collapse, resulting in one additional death. The tornado also displaced several homes from their foundations. The tornado neared U.S. Route 12 as it dissipated at 3:42 p.m. CST (21:42 UTC). Damage estimates were set at about $1.5 million.

Midway, Indiana

This was the most famous and well-publicized of the Palm Sunday tornadoes, often remembered as the first of two F4 tornadoes to hit the Dunlap (Elkhart)–Goshen area. It formed near the St. Joseph–Elkhart County border and tracked northeastward, striking Wakarusa, where it caused severe damage and killed a child. The tornado then intensified significantly as it moved toward northern Goshen and the Midway Trailer Court. As Huffman awaited the storm, he noticed the tornado approaching from the southwest, so he began taking a series of photographs, six in all. The photographs captured the evolution of the storm into twin funnels as it struck the trailer park, with each funnel gyrating around a central point yet only producing one damage swath. The tornado struck the trailer park at 6:32 p.m. CDT (23:32 UTC). (Roughly 45 minutes later, another F4 tornado passed just to the north of the Midway Trailer Court, splitting into yet another pair of funnels as it struck the Sunnyside neighborhood in Dunlap.) The tornado obliterated roughly 80% of the trailer park, with 10 deaths, and caused F4 damage to numerous other homes near Middlebury, some of which were swept clean. Three more people died in the Middlebury area before the tornado ended. While officially considered one tornado, recent studies indicate that the event consisted of two tornadoes and was not a multiple-vortex event. Unofficial estimates of the death toll vary, with Grazulis listing 14 deaths instead of the 31 appearing in the official National Climatic Data Center/National Centers for Environmental Information  (NCDC/NCEI) database.

Coldwater Lake–Southern Hillsdale–Manitou Beach–Devils Lake–Southern Tecumseh, Michigan (two tornadoes)

With the telephone lines down, emergency services in Elkhart County, Indiana, could not warn Michigan residents that the tornadoes were headed their way. Of the southernmost counties of Michigan, all but three—Berrien, Cass, and St. Joseph—were hit.

Starting just south of the Indiana-Michigan state line, near Orland, the first, deadliest, and strongest of two massive tornadoes, each rated F4, debarked trees and leveled homes on the shoreline of Lake Pleasant in Steuben County. Crossing into Branch County, Michigan, the tornado damaged more homes in East Gilead. Debris from the empty foundations was strewn over the surface of the lake and deposited in a small cove. The tornado destroyed 200 homes and caused one additional death as it traversed Branch County. The tornado hurled a New York Central Railroad freight train into Baw Beese Lake. Across Hillsdale County the tornado killed 11 or more people and destroyed 177 homes.

Entering Lenawee County, the tornado traversed the Irish Hills and approached Manitou Beach–Devils Lake. As it struck Manitou Beach–Devils Lake, the tornado destroyed the Manitou Beach Baptist Church; of the 50 people then in attendance for Palm Sunday services, 26 failed to reach shelter in time and were stranded beneath debris for up to two hours. Eight fatalities occurred in the church. The local dance pavilion on Devils Lake was demolished, having recently been rebuilt after a fire on Labor Day in 1963. One of the tornadoes damaged parts of Onsted; in the nearby village of Tipton, which suffered a direct hit, 94% of the town's buildings were damaged or destroyed. Across Lenawee County the tornado destroyed 189 homes. About 30 minutes later, the Manitou Beach–Devils Lake area in Lenawee County was hit by the second of the two tornadoes, causing numerous fatalities, including a family of six in eastern Lenawee County. Many homes were hit twice.

One or both F4 tornadoes struck the then-Village of Milan, south of Ann Arbor. The Wolverine Plastics building on the Monroe County side of town, then the top employer in the village, was destroyed with the roof being completely removed in the process. The Milan Junior High School was seriously damaged along with the adjacent, senior high school, disused since 1958, at Hurd and North streets, on the Washtenaw County side of Milan. Milan became a city in 1967; opened a new Middle School in 1969, which replaced the old Junior High School; and eventually demolished the 1900 building that housed the former junior and senior high schools.

The first of the F4 tornadoes produced a  wind gust at Tecumseh—the highest wind measurement in a tornado until a measurement of  near Red Rock, Oklahoma, on April 26, 1991; a higher measurement of —later corrected to —in the F5 tornado of May 3, 1999, broke this record. Total damage estimates from the two tornadoes were $32 million with more than 550 homes, a church, and 100 cottages destroyed.

Southern Elkhart–Dunlap, Indiana

This was the second and deadliest of two violent tornadoes to strike the Elkhart–Goshen area, with the highest single-tornado death toll in the outbreak. It hit Dunlap about an hour after another F4 tornado hit the Midway trailer park a short distance to the southeast. Few people received warning due to the passage of the earlier storm, which disrupted communications and downed power lines, thereby affecting rescue efforts after the earlier tornado as well. The Dunlap tornado first produced tree damage beginning just west of State Road 331. Prior to crossing the St. Joseph–Elkhart county line, the tornado claimed its first two fatalities. As the tornado neared Dunlap, it intensified into an extremely violent tornado. It then devastated the Sunnyside Housing addition and the unoccupied Sunnyside Mennonite Church. The Sunnyside subdivision was completely destroyed, with many homes swept away. The Kingston Heights subdivision was similarly devastated. The death toll from the two subdivisions was 28 people, with another six killed in a home and truck stop at the junction of State Road 15 and U.S. Route 20. The Palm Sunday Tornado Memorial Park now exists near this location, at the corner of County Road 45 and Cole Street in Dunlap. After striking Dunlap, the tornado apparently weakened somewhat, but still generated extensive damage eastward to Hunter Lake. Shortly before dissipating, the tornado tossed cars off the Indiana Turnpike near Scott. Like the Midway tornado, the Dunlap event was also was witnessed as twin funnels: a photographer standing amidst the wreckage of the Midway Trailer Court captured the Dunlap tornado as it passed just to the north. It may have been the strongest tornado on April 11; in fact, Grazulis and other sources have assigned an F5 rating to the tornado, though it is officially rated F4.

Russiaville–Alto–Southern Kokomo–Greentown–Southern Marion, Indiana

As the Lafayette–Middlefork tornado dissipated, a new tornado developed nearby without a definite break in the damage path. Due to changes in the intensity of the damage, surveyors split the path into two separate tornadoes. At about 7:28 p.m. CDT (00:28 UTC), the new, rapidly strengthening tornado hit Russiaville, causing severe damage to the entire community. The  tornado destroyed or damaged 90% of the community, though most of the damage ranged from F0–F3. Collectively, the tornado destroyed 100 homes in Alto and Kokomo. The Maple Crest apartment complex was unroofed and incurred the collapse of its uppermost walls. As the tornado continued eastward, it apparently intensified and killed ten people in Greentown, most of whom had been in automobiles. The tornado destroyed 80 homes, many of which it obliterated and swept away, as it struck multiple subdivisions in the Greentown area. In all, the tornado killed 18 people and injured another 600 in Howard County alone. Just south of Swayzee, the tornado leveled some more homes and caused three additional deaths. As it struck the southern outskirts of Marion, the tornado leveled a pair of homes, partly unroofed a Department of Veterans Affairs (VA) hospital, and wrecked the Panorama shopping center. 20 injuries occurred at the VA hospital, and looters scavenged the shopping center. Several homes were destroyed and hundreds others damaged in Marion as well. The tornado killed five people as it traversed Grant County. Losses totaled $500.025 million, $12 million alone of which occurred near Marion.

Pittsfield–Grafton–Strongsville, Ohio

Shortly after 11:00 p.m. CDT (04:00 UTC), a tornado touched down in Lorain County, Ohio, and headed east-northeastward. Around 11:12 p.m. CDT (04:12 UTC), the  tornado struck Pittsfield, Ohio, then located at the junction of Ohio State Route 303 and Ohio State Road 58. Of the settlement's 50 residents, the tornado killed seven. The tornado also killed two motorists whose arrival in town coincided with the tornado's. According to the U.S. Weather Bureau Office (WBO) in Cleveland, Ohio, the tornado produced "total" devastation as it struck Pittsfield. The tornado destroyed 12 homes, six of which "literally vanished," along with a combined gas station/grocery store, a pair of churches, and the town hall. The tornado also toppled a statue at a Civil War monument, but the concrete base of the statue remained standing.

After ravaging Pittsfield, the tornado damaged 200 homes in and near Grafton, some of which indicated F2-level intensity. A total of 17 homes were severely damaged in nearby LaGrange and Columbia Station. Several witnesses also saw two funnels merging into one, similar to the Midway–Dunlap tornadoes. The tornado displayed borderline-F5-level damage in northernmost Strongsville. There, 18 homes were leveled, some of which were cleanly swept from their foundations, and 50 others were severely damaged in town. Damages amounted to at least $5 million and are officially listed as $50 million. Grazulis classified the tornado as an F5, but it is officially rated F4.

Non-tornadic effects

A vigorous, pre-frontal squall line generated severe thunderstorm winds from eastern Iowa to lakefront Illinois. The strong winds, coupled with hail, damaged or destroyed numerous structures, felled trees, and downed utility wires. Across Northern Illinois, numerous funnel clouds were sighted in Wheaton, Carol Stream, Winfield, West Chicago, Aurora, and Rockford, respectively.

Aftermath and recovery

In the Midwest, at least 266 people—some sources say 256–271—were killed and 1,500 injured (1,200 in Indiana). This is the fourth-deadliest day for tornadoes on record, trailing April 3, 1974 (310 deaths), the April 27, 2011 (324), and March 18, 1925 (747, including 695 by the Tri-State Tornado). It occurred on Palm Sunday, an important day in the Christian religion, and many people were attending services at church, one possible reason why some warnings were not received. There had been a late winter in 1965, much of March being cold and snowy; and as the day progressed, warm temperatures encouraged picnickers and sightseers. For many areas, April 11 marked the first day of above-average temperatures, so members of the public, being outdoors or attending services, failed to receive updates from radio and television. The high death toll in the outbreak despite accurate warnings led to changes in the dissemination of severe weather alerts by the Severe Local Storm Warning Center in Kansas City, Missouri, now the Norman, Oklahoma-based Storm Prediction Center. The U.S. Weather Bureau investigated the large number of deaths. Although weather-radar stations were few and far between in 1965, the severe nature of the thunderstorms was identified with adequate time to disseminate warnings. But the warning system failed as the public never received them. Additionally, the public did not know the difference between a Forecast and an Alert. Thus the terms tornado watch and tornado warning were implemented in 1966.  Their discussion led to establishment of the official "watch" and "warning" procedures in use since 1966. Additionally, communities began activating civil defense sirens during tornado warnings, and storm spotting via amateur radio networks and other media received increased logistical support and emphasis, leading to the eventual creation of SKYWARN.
Five books on the 1965 Palm Sunday tornado outbreak have been penned to date. David Wagler of Indiana released "The Mighty Whirlwind" in 1966, interviewing survivors and eyewitnesses within months after the tornadoes. Dan Cherry released "Night of the Wind" in 2002; Roger Pickenpaugh published "The Night of the Wicked Winds" in 2003; Cherry wrote "50 Years Later" in 2015 with all-color images of the aftermath; and Janis Thornton published "The 1965 Palm Sunday Tornadoes in Indiana" in 2022.

Oddities/records
Additionally, significant scientific data were gathered from aerial surveys of the tornado paths. The outbreak was the first to be studied in-depth aerially by tornado scientist Tetsuya Theodore Fujita, who proposed new theories about the structure of tornadoes based upon his study. Dr. Fujita discovered suction vortices during the Palm Sunday tornado outbreak. It had previously been thought the reason why tornadoes could hit one house and leave another across the street completely unscathed was because the tornado would "jump" from one house to another. However, Fujita discovered that the actual reason is most destruction is caused by suction vortices: small, intense mini-tornadoes within the main tornado.

The tornado outbreak generated 38 significant tornadoes, 18 of them violent—F4 or F5 on the Fujita scale of tornado intensity—and 22 deadly. The 17 violent tornadoes on April 11, 1965, set a 24-hour record that stood until the first Super Outbreak produced 30 in 1974. With 137 people killed and 1,200 injured in Indiana alone, the outbreak set a 24-hour record for tornado deaths in that state.

An unusually pronounced elevated mixed layer (EML) was present over the Great Lakes region during the outbreak—a similar pattern having been observed on March 28, 1920, April 3, 1956, and April 3, 1974. A strong jet stream, combined with tornadoes, lofted topsoil from Illinois and Missouri eastward, producing hazy skies prior to the arrival of storms.

See also
Lists of tornadoes and tornado outbreaks
List of North American tornadoes and tornado outbreaks
Tornado outbreak of April 2–3, 1956 – Produced a powerful F5 tornado family in Michigan
1920 Palm Sunday tornado outbreak – Generated deadly F4 tornadoes in the Great Lakes region
1994 Palm Sunday tornado outbreak – Yielded long-tracked, intense tornadoes from Alabama to the Carolinas
1974 Super Outbreak – Associated with numerous violent tornadoes across much of Indiana and Greater Cincinnati

Notes

References

Sources

All articles with unsourced statements
F4 tornadoes by date
Tornadoes of 1965
Tornadoes in Illinois
Tornadoes in Indiana
Tornadoes in Michigan
Tornadoes in Ohio
Palm Sunday Tornado Outbreak, 1965
Palm Sunday tornado outbreaks
Tornado outbreaks
Strongsville, Ohio
April 1965 events in the United States
1965 in Michigan